The 2007–08 season was Klubi i Futbollit Tirana's 69th competitive season, 69th consecutive season in the Kategoria Superiore and 87th year in existence as a football club. It covered a period from 1 July 2007 to 30 June 2008.

Squad

Competitions

Albanian Supercup

Kategoria Superiore

League table

Results summary

Results by round

Matches

UEFA Champions League

First qualifying round

References

KF Tirana seasons
Tirana